Bosnia is the northern region of Bosnia and Herzegovina, encompassing roughly 81% of the country; the other region, the southern part, is Herzegovina.

The two regions have formed a geopolitical entity since medieval times, and the name "Bosnia" commonly occurs in historical and geopolitical senses as generally referring to both regions (Bosnia and Herzegovina). The official use of the combined name started only in the late period of Ottoman rule.

Geography

Bosnia lies mainly in the Dinaric Alps, ranging to the southern borders of the Pannonian plain, with the rivers Sava and Drina marking its northern and eastern borders.

The area of Bosnia comprises approximately 39,021 km2, and makes up about 80% of the territory of the present-day state of Bosnia and Herzegovina. There are no true borders between the region of Bosnia and the region of Herzegovina. Unofficially, Herzegovina is south of the mountain Ivan planina. According to another unofficial definition, Herzegovina encompasses the watersheds of the Neretva and Trebišnjica rivers.

History

The Central part of Bosnia was inhabited by Neolithic farmers that belonged to the Kakanj culture, and later replaced by another neolithic culture called the Butmir culture. The first Indo-Europeans are thought to be members of eneolithic Vučedol culture.

In the Bronze Age the area is thought to have been inhabited by Iron Age Central Bosnian cultural group and Glasinac culture. Later on the Illyrian tribe of the Daesitiates would become dominant in these area.

The historical records of the region are scarce until its first recorded standalone (domestic) ruler and viceroy of Bosnian state, Ban Borić, was appointed in 1154.

De Administrando Imperio describes a small Serbian župa of Bosona that was located around the river Bosna in the modern-day fields of Sarajevo and of Visoko.

Under its first known by name ruler, Stephen, Duke of Bosnia, in the 1080s, the region spanned the upper course of the rivers Bosna, the Vrbas and the Neretva.

At the end of the 14th century, under Tvrtko I of Bosnia, the Bosnian kingdom included most of the territory of today's Bosnia and of what would later become known as Herzegovina.

The kingdom lost its independence to the Ottoman Empire in 1463. The region of Bosnia's westernmost city at the time of the conquest was Jajce.

The Ottoman Empire initially expanded into Bosnia and Herzegovina through a territory called the Bosansko Krajište. It was transformed into the Sanjak of Bosnia and the Sanjak of Herzegovina after 1462/1463. The first Ottoman administration called Eyalet of Bosnia was finally formed in 1527, after long armed resistance to the north and to the west by Counts Franjo and Ivaniš Berislavić of the noble house of Berislavići Grabarski.

Eventually, following the Great Turkish War, in the 18th century the Eyalet came to encompass the area largely matching that of today's Bosnia and Herzegovina.

In 1833, the Eyalet of Herzegovina was temporarily split off under Ali-paša Rizvanbegović. The area acquired the name of "Bosnia and Herzegovina" in 1853 as a result of a twist in political events following his death. After the 1864 administrative reform, the province was named Vilayet of Bosnia. Austria-Hungary occupied the whole country in 1878. It remained formally part of the Ottoman Empire under the title of Condominium of Bosnia and Herzegovina until 1908, when Austria-Hungary provoked the Bosnian crisis by formally annexing the province.

Regional identity
Within Bosnia and Herzegovina, the region of Bosnia has a traditional regional identity, distinctive from the regional identity of the neighboring Herzegovina. Bosnian regional identity was attested as early as the 10th century, when Constantin VII Porphyrogenetos referred to Bosnia as a particular region. Development of Bosnia's regional identity continued throughout the Middle Ages, and it was also acknowledged in the 15th century by the Ottoman conquerors, who created the Sanjak of Bosnia in 1463, giving it a regional name, which was not always the case. By the end of the Ottoman rule (1878), regional Bosnianhood became a distinctive mark of local identity, that transcended traditional ethnic and religious distinctions within the general population of Bosnia, and the same notion of regional Bosniandom was preserved throughout the periods of Austro-Hungarian (1878-1918) and Yugoslav (1918-1992) rule.

Subregions
Podrinje, eastern
Bosanska Krajina, northwestern
Central Bosnia, central
Posavina, northernmost
Semberija, northeastern
Tropolje, western

Gallery

See also 
History of Bosnia
Herzegovina

References

Sources

External links

 
Regions of Bosnia and Herzegovina
Bosnia